James P. Pierpont (June 16, 1866 – December 9, 1938) was a Connecticut-born American mathematician. His father Cornelius Pierpont was a wealthy New Haven businessman. He did undergraduate studies at Worcester Polytechnic Institute, initially in mechanical engineering, but turned to mathematics. He went to Europe after graduating in 1886. He studied in Berlin, and later in Vienna.  He prepared his PhD at the University of Vienna under Leopold Gegenbauer and Gustav Ritter von Escherich. His thesis, defended in 1894, is entitled Zur Geschichte der Gleichung fünften Grades bis zum Jahre 1858. After his defense, he returned to New Haven and was appointed as a lecturer at Yale University, where he spent most of his career. In 1898, he became professor.

Initially, his research dealt with Galois theory of equations. The Pierpont primes are named after Pierpont, who introduced them in 1895 in connection with a problem of constructing regular polygons with the use of conic sections.
After 1900, he worked in real and complex analysis.

In his textbooks of real analysis, he introduced a definition of the integral analogous to Lebesgue integration. His definition was later criticized by Maurice Fréchet. Finally, in the 1920s, his interest turned to non-Euclidean geometry.

Papers by J. P. Pierpont

Books by J. P. Pierpont
 Lectures On The Theory Of Functions Of Real Variables Vol. I (Ginn and co., 1905)
 Lectures On The Theory Of Functions Of Real Variables Vol. II (Ginn and co., 1912)
 Functions of a complex variable (Ginn and co., 1914)

External links
 Oystein Ore, James Pierpont—In memoriam Bull. Amer. Math. Soc. 45, (1939), pp. 481-486
 
 http://www-history.mcs.st-andrews.ac.uk/Biographies/Pierpont.html

1866 births
1938 deaths
19th-century American mathematicians
20th-century American mathematicians
Yale University faculty
Worcester Polytechnic Institute alumni